Burke is a village in Franklin County, New York, United States. The population was 211 at the 2010 census. The village is in the town of Burke and is northeast of Malone, the county seat.

History 

The region was known as "West Chateaugay" when the first settlers arrived at the end of the 18th century. The community was once called "The Hollow" and "Andrusville".

The town of Burke is home to the Wilder Farm.

Geography
Burke village is located south of the center of the town of Burke at  (44.90103, -74.170449), in northeastern Franklin County.

The Little Trout River passes through the village, which is south of U.S. Route 11. Via the Trout River and Chateauguay River downstream (to the north), it is part of the St. Lawrence River watershed.

Demographics

As of the census of 2000, there were 213 people, 85 households, and 54 families residing in the village. The population density was 729.0 people per square mile (283.6/km2). There were 94 housing units at an average density of 321.7 per square mile (125.2/km2). The racial makeup of the village was 98.59% White, 0.94% Native American, and 0.47% from two or more races. Hispanic or Latino of any race were 1.41% of the population.

There were 85 households, out of which 24.7% had children under the age of 18 living with them, 49.4% were married couples living together, 9.4% had a female householder with no husband present, and 35.3% were non-families. 30.6% of all households were made up of individuals, and 17.6% had someone living alone who was 65 years of age or older. The average household size was 2.32 and the average family size was 2.82.

In the village, the population was spread out, with 19.7% under the age of 18, 9.4% from 18 to 24, 23.0% from 25 to 44, 24.4% from 45 to 64, and 23.5% who were 65 years of age or older. The median age was 44 years. For every 100 females, there were 95.4 males. For every 100 females age 18 and over, there were 92.1 males.

The median income for a household in the village was $35,714, and the median income for a family was $36,563. Males had a median income of $30,250 versus $31,875 for females. The per capita income for the village was $15,756. About 3.6% of families and 10.1% of the population were below the poverty line, including 3.7% of those under the age of eighteen and 31.6% of those 65 or over.

References

External links
 Early history of the Burke area
 Read and Listen to the Oral History of Burke

Villages in New York (state)
Villages in Franklin County, New York